KTHI (107.1 FM, "107.1 K-Hits") is a commercial radio station located in Caldwell, Idaho, broadcasting to the Boise, Idaho, area.  KTHI airs a classic hits music format.

History
The station launched in 1983 as a country station branded as "C-107" with the KCID-FM call letters. In 1997, the station flipped to a Modern AC format and was rebranded as "107.1 CID". In May 1999, the station flipped to Adult Contemporary and was rebranded as "Star 107.1". In 2002, KCID-FM changed the call letters to KTHI and flipped to a classic hits format and rebranded now known as "107.1 K-Hits".

Ownership Changes
Journal Communications (KTHI's former owner) and the E. W. Scripps Company announced on July 30, 2014, that the two companies would merge to create a new broadcast company under the E.W. Scripps Company name that will own the two companies' broadcast properties, including KTHI. The transaction is slated to be completed in 2015, pending shareholder and regulatory approvals.

In January 2018, Scripps announced that it would sell all of its radio stations. In August 2018, Lotus Communications announced that it would acquire Scripps' Boise & Tucson clusters for $8 million. The sale was completed on December 12.

References

External links
KTHI official website

THI
Classic hits radio stations in the United States
Caldwell, Idaho
Radio stations established in 1983
1983 establishments in Idaho
Lotus Communications stations